Fred Briggs may refer to:

 Fred Briggs (rugby league) (born 1980), Australian rugby league player
 Fred Briggs (footballer) (1908–1985), English footballer